Laurel is a census-designated place (CDP) in western Henrico County, Virginia. The population was 16,713 at the 2010 United States Census. It is the county seat of Henrico County.

It is the location of the Laurel Skate Park. The bowl was recently filled in with smooth concrete and the vertical ramp removed to make way for safer amenities.

Laurel is the location of the Laurel Industrial School Historic District.

History
Laurel's previous names include Hungary, Hungary Station, Jenningsville, and School. In the 19th century, Laurel was a stop on the Richmond, Fredericksburg and Potomac (RF&P) Railroad. It was a spur line that connected the coalfields in western Henrico with the rail network. During the Civil War, the station was burned. Union Army Colonel Ulric Dahlgren's body was secretly buried there in March 1864; the body was later re-interred to Philadelphia.  The RF&P railroad is succeeded by CSX Transportation, which still operates on the same rights-of-way.

The A.A. Harvey General Store was built  to serve the community. Over the years, the building has undergone several transformations. It went from general store to housing. It then became the Crystal Ice Co. and the Laurel Post Office, where Lillian Merkle was Postmaster. The Post Office was one of only a few in the United States that was privately owned. The building was completely restored in 1991 to its present use as the Laurel Gallery. Robert Bluford, the preservationist, made efforts to ensure that the restored building stayed true to its original style.

Geography
Laurel is located at  (37.634012, −77.506661).

Demographics

As of the census of 2000, there were 14,875 people, 6,288 households, and 3,634 families residing in the CDP. The racial makeup of the CDP was 64.98% White, 24.30% African American, 0.33% Native American, 6.16% Asian, 0.05% Pacific Islander, 2.08% from other races, and 2.08% from two or more races. Hispanic or Latino of any race were 4.15% of the population.

There were 6,288 households, out of which 27.2% had children under the age of 18 living with them, 42.0% were married couples living together, 12.0% had a female householder with no husband present, and 42.2% were non-families. 32.8% of all households were made up of individuals, and 7.1% had someone living alone who was 65 years of age or older. The average household size was 2.24 and the average family size was 2.87.

In the CDP, the population was spread out, with 20.2% under the age of 18, 10.6% from 18 to 24, 38.5% from 25 to 44, 19.6% from 45 to 64, and 11.0% who were 65 years of age or older. The median age was 34 years. For every 100 females, there were 93.4 males. For every 100 females age 18 and over, there were 91.6 males.

The median income for a household in the CDP was $42,128, and the median income for a family was $52,579. Males had a median income of $31,495 versus $30,158 for females. The per capita income for the CDP was $21,893. About 3.8% of families and 5.4% of the population were below the poverty line, including 4.7% of those under age 18 and 2.0% of those age 65 or over.

References

Census-designated places in Henrico County, Virginia
Census-designated places in Virginia